Youthful Folly is a 1920 American silent drama film directed by Alan Crosland and starring Olive Thomas, Crauford Kent, and Helen Gill.

Cast
 Olive Thomas as Nancy Sherwin 
 Crauford Kent as David Montgomery 
 Helen Gill as Lola Ainsley 
 Hugh Huntley as Jimsy Blake 
 Charles Craig as Reverend Bluebottle 
 Howard Truesdale as Jonathan Ainsley 
 Florida Kingsley as Aunt Martha 
 Eugenie Woodward as Aunt Jenny 
 Pauline Dempsey as Mammy

References

Bibliography
 Monaco, James. The Encyclopedia of Film. Perigee Books, 1991.

External links

1920 films
1920 drama films
Silent American drama films
Films directed by Alan Crosland
American silent feature films
American black-and-white films
Selznick Pictures films
1920s American films